Acanthogorgia is a genus of corals belonging to the family Acanthogorgiidae.

The genus has cosmopolitan distribution.

Species

Species:

Acanthogorgia acrosoma 
Acanthogorgia aldabra 
Acanthogorgia angustiflora

References

Octocorallia genera
Acanthogorgiidae